KTNZ (1360 AM) is a radio station broadcasting a Catholic religious format. Licensed to Amarillo, Texas, United States, the station is currently owned by Catholic Radio of the Texas High Plains.

Formerly KDJW, this station became KTNZ on March 1, 2021, as part of the move of the English-language Catholic programming from Saint Valentine Catholic Radio to 1010 AM (renamed KDJW). 1360 was relaunched as Spanish-language Catholic outlet "Radio San Toribio".

References

External links

Catholic radio stations
Radio stations established in 1955
TNZ
TNZ
1955 establishments in Texas
Catholic Church in Texas
Radio stations in Amarillo, Texas